The Clambakes Series Volume 2 is the second of three limited edition Live albums by Superchunk known as the Clambakes series. Released in 2002 The Clambakes Series Volume 2 (limited to 2,500 copies) is a film score that Superchunk was commissioned to write. It was recorded live at the Castro Theater in San Francisco, April 23, 2002 during the San Francisco International Film Festival at a showing of Teinosuke Kinugasa's 1926 film A Page of Madness.

Track listing
 "Intro/Titles"
 "Rainy Nights & Dancers"
 "Page of Madness Theme"
 "A Pretty Page"
 "Madness Montage"
 "Don't Look Back"
 "Wives and Daughters"
 "Briefly Calm"
 "Riot #2"
 "Daydreaming an Escape / Mask March"
 "Mopping Up"

2002 albums
Superchunk albums